John Barnard (born c. 1661–2; floruit 1685–93) was a supporter of James II of England.

Barnard was the son of Dr. John Barnard, fellow of Lincoln College, Oxford, and sometime rector of Waddington, near Lincoln, by Lettice, daughter of Dr. Peter Heylyn. He became a student of Lincoln College (matriculating 17 November 1676 at the age of fifteen), and was elected fellow of Brasenose College (being then B.A.) in 1682. This date (which we learn from Anthony à Wood) gives us 1661–2 for the date of his birth. He proceeded afterwards to holy orders in the church of England.

According to Wood, in December 1685, after James II's accession, Barnard ‘took all occasions to talk at Bal. coffee house on behalf of popery.’ Later he declared himself a papist, and took the name of Joh. Augustine Barnard (or Bernard) ‘protected by the king’ (May 1686), ‘for what he should do or omit.’ He was ‘dispenc'd’ ‘from going to common prayer, rarely to sacrament.’ On 3 January 1686–7 ‘came a mandamus from the king that he should succeed Mr. —— Halton, of Queen's College [Oxford], in the [White's] moral philosophy lecture.’ On 28 March 1687 he was elected and admitted moral philosophy reader. In October 1688 he left the university, and soon afterwards sent in his resignation of his fellowship at Brasenose upon a forethought ‘that the Prince of Orange would turn the scales, as he did.’ He likewise resigned the moral philosophy lecture 5 January 1688–9. He is found in Ireland with King James when he landed there. He was ‘taken notice of’ by his majesty, who ‘talk'd familiarly with him.’ In September 1690 he returned from Ireland and came to Chester, ‘poor and bare.’ He was reconciled to the church of England, ‘as 'tis said,’ and was ‘maintain'd with dole for some time by the Bishop of Chester (Stratford).’

Wood states that he ‘wrote some little things that were printed.’ His only known literary performance was that he ‘continued, corrected, and enlarged, with great additions throughout,’ the ‘great Geographical Dictionary of Edmund Bohun, Esq.’ (1693, folio), and placed before it ‘A Reflection upon the Grand Dictionary Historique, or the Great Historical Dictionary of Lewis Morery, D.D., printed at Utrecht 1692.’ The date of his death is unrecorded.

References

1661 births
1662 births
17th-century Roman Catholics
Alumni of Lincoln College, Oxford
Anglican priest converts to Roman Catholicism
17th-century English Anglican priests
English Roman Catholics
Fellows of Brasenose College, Oxford
Year of death missing